John Day Smith (February 25, 1845 – March 5, 1933) was an American lawyer and politician.

Biography
Smith was born in Litchfield, Kennebec County, Maine on February 25, 1845. He went to the Litchfield public schools and then served in the 19th Maine Infantry Regiment during the American Civil War. After the war, Smith went to Brown University and to Columbia Law School before moving to Minneapolis, Minnesota in 1880 and practicing law.

Smith served in the Minnesota House of Representatives in 1889 and 1890 and in the Minnesota Senate from 1891 to 1894. He was a Republican. Smith then served as a Minnesota District Court judge.

He married Mary Hardy Chadbourne in 1872, and they had one daughter. Mary died in 1874, and he remarried to Laura Bean on September 16, 1879. They had a son and three daughters.

Smith died at his home in Minneapolis on March 5, 1933, and was buried at Lakewood Cemetery.

Works
 Cases on Constitutional Law (1896)
 The History of the Nineteenth Regiment of Maine Volunteer Infantry, 1862-1865 (1909)

References

1845 births
1933 deaths
People from Litchfield, Maine
Lawyers from Minneapolis
Politicians from Minneapolis
People of Maine in the American Civil War
Brown University alumni
Columbia Law School alumni
Minnesota state court judges
Republican Party Minnesota state senators
Republican Party members of the Minnesota House of Representatives
Burials at Lakewood Cemetery